Kyone-Long-Ywar-Thit is a village in the Mon State of south-east Myanmar. It lies in Ye Township in Mawlamyine District.

See also
List of cities, towns and villages in Burma: A

References

External links
Satellite map at Maplandia.com

Populated places in Mon State